Vahid Aliabadi (born February 20, 1990) is an Iranian footballer who currently plays for Saba Qom.

Club career
Aliabadi has played his entire career for Pas Hamedan.

 Assist Goals

References

1990 births
Living people
PAS Hamedan F.C. players
Iranian footballers
Mes Sarcheshme players
Persian Gulf Pro League players
Azadegan League players
Association football midfielders